Yuri Dmitrievich Kuklachyov (born 12 April 1949, in Khimki) is a Soviet and Russian clown who was awarded the title People’s Artist of the RSFSR (1986). He is known for his work with cats.

References

External links 
 Official site

1949 births
People from Khimki
Living people
Soviet clowns
Russian clowns
Cat behaviorists
People's Artists of the RSFSR
Honored Artists of the RSFSR
Recipients of the Lenin Komsomol Prize
Russian Academy of Theatre Arts alumni
Artistic directors